15th BSFC Awards
December 18, 1994

Best Film: 
 Pulp Fiction 
The 15th Boston Society of Film Critics Awards honored the best filmmaking of 1994. The awards were given on 18 December 1994.

Winners

Best Film 
1. Pulp Fiction
2. Vanya on 42nd Street
3. Ed Wood

Best Actor 
1. Albert Finney – The Browning Version
2. Wallace Shawn – Vanya on 42nd Street
3. Henry Czerny – The Boys of St. Vincent

Best Actress 
1. Julianne Moore – Vanya on 42nd Street
2. Linda Fiorentino – The Last Seduction
3. Jodie Foster – Nell

Best Supporting Actor 
Martin Landau – Ed Wood

Best Supporting Actress 
1. Kirsten Dunst – Interview with the Vampire and Little Women
2. Dianne Wiest – Bullets Over Broadway
3. Tracey Ullman – Bullets Over Broadway, I'll Do Anything and Prêt-à-Porter

Best Director 
1. Quentin Tarantino – Pulp Fiction
2. Louis Malle – Vanya on 42nd Street
3. Robert Redford – Quiz Show

Best Screenplay 
1. Quentin Tarantino and Roger Avary – Pulp Fiction
2. Paul Attanasio – Quiz Show
3. François Girard and Don McKellar – Thirty Two Short Films About Glenn Gould

Best Cinematography 
Stefan Czapsky – Ed Wood

Best Documentary 
Hoop Dreams

Best Foreign-Language Film 
Red (Trois couleurs: Rouge) • France/Poland/Switzerland

External links
Past Winners

References
Boston critics pick `Pulp' as top film The Boston Globe
1994 Boston Society of Film Critics Awards Internet Movie Database

1994
1994 film awards
1994 awards in the United States
1994 in Boston
December 1994 events in the United States